The gold chain, called Manin, consists of a 22-karat gold wire. 
The process involves making tiny rings of gold, with semi-circular hollow section, to be welded together and form a fine mesh. 
If the work is very skilled from 1 gram of gold can be obtained chains of 12–15 cm. 
This type of manual work to create the gold chains of twisted thin wires is typically Venetian. The craftwork's original name "entercosei" was generally replaced with Manin, or Manini, in the 18th century. It is a historical piece of jewelry, hard to find nowadays and particularly sought after.

The story reports that the Venetians in Constantinople, learned the process, making it their own as early as the 6th century. Manin chains adorned the necks or wrists of Venetian noblewomen and Dogaressas throughout the history of the Venetian Republic. 
Manin gold was considered dotal and it was customary for each mother to split their chains in equal shares among their daughters who transmitted this tradition to the offspring. 
For this reason it is now very rare to find a Manin chain of considerable length, although there are historical examples of 50–60 meters.

The name "Manin" for this fine work is given in honor of the Manin family, of ancient origins, who became very rich and powerful over time in Venice thanks to the merits and value of many of its members, who were able to gain the respect of people, the honor of kings and acceptance among the Friulan nobility first and the Venetian nobility later. 
The Manin, in 1740, were the richest among all noble Venetians and it is written in the Book of Gold that they enjoyed eighty thousand ducats of annual income, in addition to two hundred thousand ducats in cash and the same value in jewels. These funds came primarily from the lands: they would be either State loans or house rentals in Venice. 
Manin's name is now known to have belonged to the last doge of Venice, Ludovico Manin IV, who with dignity faced the dissolution of the Republic threatened by Napoleon Bonaparte, May 12, 1797 and presided over, the last session of the Grand Council that decreed the end, after more than eleven centuries of independence and glory.

References

Jewellery making
Gold objects